Puntal (foaled 1996) is a National Hunt racehorse who won the Betfred Gold Cup in 2004 and ran in five consecutive Grand Nationals from 2003 to 2007 with limited success. He was formally trained in France before moving to Martin Pipe in 2002. After Martin retired his son David Pipe trained him.

In the 2006 Grand National Puntal overcame a 484-day absence to finish 6th, his best finish in the historic race to date.

He finished in 8th place in the 2007 Grand National, where his high odds of 100/1 fell to 50/1 just before the race started.

After a poor run at the 2009 Cheltenham Festival, his owner decided to retire Puntal from racing.

External links
 pedigreequery.com
 racingpost.co.uk

1996 racehorse births
National Hunt racehorses
Thoroughbred family 19-c
Racehorses bred in France
Racehorses trained in the United Kingdom